Annie Louisa Swynnerton, ARA ( Robinson; 26 February 1844 – 24 October 1933) was a British painter best known for her portrait and symbolist works. She studied at Manchester School of Art and at the Académie Julian, before basing herself in the artistic community in Rome with her husband, the monumental sculptor Joseph Swynnerton. Swynnerton was influenced by George Frederic Watts and Sir Edward Burne-Jones. John Singer Sargent appreciated her work and helped her to become the first elected woman member at the Royal Academy of Arts in 1922. Swynnerton painted portraits of Henry James and Millicent Fawcett. Her main public collection of works are in Manchester Art Gallery, but individual works are also held in a few other English cities, as well as can also be seen in Glasgow, Dublin, Paris, and two in Melbourne, Australia. Annie was a close friend of leading suffragists of the day, notably the Pankhurst family.

Early life
Annie Louisa Robinson was born in Hulme, Manchester in 1844. Her parents were Francis Robinson, a solicitor, and Ann Sanderson. Swynnerton had six sisters. She made and sold watercolours to supplement the family's income during a difficult financial period. Her sisters Julia and Emily also studied at Manchester School of Art, recorded as being prize-winning students in The Manchester Guardian in 1873 (24 Dec, p8.)

Education
Swynnerton trained at the Manchester School of Art, beginning in 1871. She won a gold prize and a scholarship for an oil and watercolour painting. From 1874 to 1876, she studied in Rome along with her friend and fellow artist, Susan Isabel Dacre. The women then studied at the Académie Julian in Paris from 1877 to 1880. Swynnerton was influenced by the works of Jules Bastien-Lepage. She lived in Manchester in 1880 and by 1882 was living in London.

Artist

Style
Annie painted portraits, figures, symbolist works and landscapes. George Frederic Watts and Sir Edward Burne-Jones were supporters of her career. According to Linda Murray, "She was much influenced by Watts, and many of her subjects were of the allegorical or symbolic type which was his forte. Her drawing was solid, and she had a sculptural grasp of form allied to fresh, broken colour displaying affinities with Impressionism. The catalogue for the Tate exhibition "Exposed. The Victorian Nude" states that "Rome based Annie Swynnerton was one of the most daring female painters of the nude, often shocking audiences with her robustly painted figures".

Swynnerton's works incorporated aspects of Neoclassicism, Pre-Raphaelitism and Impressionism. The Magazine of Art described one of her works, "[A] highly imaginative design by [Swynnerton] is Mater Triumphalis. The limbs of the figure are somewhat heavy in outline, whilst there is a certain metallic appearance in the colouring that is quite apart from the idea of the flowing life-blood in a human body." She was also adept at painting children.

Career
Dacre and Swynnerton shared a studio. In 1879, the two women founded the Manchester Society of Women Painters, which offered art education and exhibitions. Emily Robinson was also a member. Swynnerton painted Dacre's portrait, which was exhibited in 1880 at the Royal Academy of Arts. It was given to Manchester Art Gallery by the sitter in 1932. She was the second woman to sit on the Liverpool Autumn Exhibition hanging committee in 1895.

Swynnerton painted portraits of members of the Garrett family, including Agnes Garrett, Dame Millicent Garrett Fawcett, which was purchased by the Chantrey Bequest for the nation and is at the Tate Gallery, and Louisa Garrett Anderson. 

She painted portraits of people close to the Garretts, including Henry James and Rev. William Gaskell, husband of novelist Elizabeth Gaskell. Dame Ethel Smyth was a patron to Swynnerton. John Singer Sargent made a painting of Swynnerton and Smyth's sister, Mrs. Charles Hunter.

With an initial introduction by Burne-Jones, Swynnerton exhibited at the Royal Academy of Arts from 1879 to 1886 and then 1902 to 1934. John Singer Sargent appreciated and purchased her work. He gave the nation The Oreads made by Swynnerton. He was instrumental in her election in 1922 to become the first female associate of the Royal Academy since the 18th century and the first woman to be elected into the organisation. Swynnerton's work was also exhibited at other national and international exhibitions, including Aberdeen, Doncaster, Huddersfield, Manchester, and Chicago and Pittsburgh. In 1893, Florence Nightingale at Scutari was shown at Women's Exhibition at the Chicago World's Exposition. According to Hellary Fraser, author of Women Writing Art History in the Nineteenth Century, the work showed the manner with which women artists could convey tender feeling with strong artistic composition and colour. Swynnerton was included in the 2018 exhibit Women in Paris 1850–1900.

Suffragism
She was an active supporter of the women's suffrage movement of the time, and was a signatory to the 1889 National Union of Women's Suffrage Societies' Declaration in Favour of Women's Suffrage.

Personal life
She met sculptor Joseph William Swynnerton, from the Isle of Man, possibly while the two were both living in Rome. They married in 1883 and lived primarily in Rome and had a studio in Sheppard's Bush in London. The Swynnertons were married until 1910, when he died.

Swynnerton's eyesight deteriorated in her later years. Following her husband's death, she lived in Chelsea, London and Rome, before finally settling on Hayling Island, England. She died there in 1933. There was a posthumous sale of the contents of her former studio, removed from 1A The Avenue, 76 Fulham Road, London, SW3 at Christie's in London on 9 February 1934. This included her own work (both finished and unfinished), her small collection of pictures by Old Masters (including Guercino and Moroni) together with frames and easels. In her will, and in memory of Susan Isabel Dacre, she left a bequest to Francis Dodd, an artist.

Swynnerton was described as follows:

Collections

See also
 List of English women artists
 Women Painters of the World, published 1905

Notes

References

Further reading 
 Thomson, Susan. Manchester's Victorian Art Scene And Its Unrecognised Artists , Manchester Art Press, 2007 
 Thomson, Susan. The Life and Works of Annie Louisa Swynnerton , Manchester Art Press, 2018

External links

 
 AnnieLouisaSwynnerton.com A web collection of all the known works of Annie Louisa Swynnerton for which images can be found.
 Profile on Royal Academy of Arts Collections
 

1844 births
1933 deaths
19th-century English painters
20th-century English painters
19th-century English women artists
20th-century English women artists
Artists from Manchester
Associates of the Royal Academy
English feminists
English suffragists
English women painters
People from Chorlton-on-Medlock
Society of Women Artists members